This is a list of diplomatic missions in Angola. There are currently 60 embassies in Luanda, and many countries maintain consulates in other Angolan cities (not including honorary consulates).

Diplomatic missions in Luanda

Embassies

Other missions or delegations 
 (Delegation)

Consular missions

Benguela
 (Consulate)
 (Consulate-General)

Cabinda
 (Consulate-General)

Luena
 (Consulate-General)
 (Consulate-General)

Menongue
 (Consulate-General)

Ondjiva
 (Consulate-General)

Non-resident embassies 
Resident in Lisbon, Portugal

Resident in Pretoria, South Africa

Resident in Windhoek, Namibia

Resident in other cities

 (Abuja)
 (Brazzaville)
 (Harare)
 (Maputo)
 (Kinshasa)
 (Valletta)
 (Lusaka)
  (Stockholm)
 (Lusaka)

Closed missions

See also 
 Foreign relations of Angola
 List of diplomatic missions of Angola

References

External links
 Embassy of Angola in the United Kingdom

 
Diplomatic missions
Angola